Mikey Kile (born February 6, 1983) is an American professional stock car racing driver. He is a veteran of the Pro Cup Series and the Automobile Racing Club of America.

Personal life
Kile was born in Westlake, Louisiana on February 6, 1983, and still resides there; he is a fourth-generation racing driver, with his father, grandfather, and great-grandfather all competing in various forms of motorsport. Kile graduated from Westlake High School in 2001, and is married, to Kasha, with one son.

Career
Kile began his racing career at age eight, competing in kart racing events; he would win national championships in World Karting Association and International Kart Federation competition during his karting career. Kile moved to stock car competition in 2005, competing in the USAR Pro Cup Series and the NASCAR AutoZone Elite Division, Southeast Series; his best Pro Cup season came in 2008, winning his first race in the series at Salem Speedway as well as the Northern Division Rookie of the Year award.

Kile moved up to NASCAR and ARCA competition in 2009, competing for Brad Keselowski Racing on a limited basis; running for Venturini Motorsports in the ARCA Re/MAX Series in 2010, he finished fifth in points, scoring his first career win at Michigan International Speedway. He also made his first career start in the NASCAR-sanctioned Nationwide Series in 2010, at Nashville Superspeedway for Braun Racing.

Kile competed on a limited basis in the Nationwide Series for Turner Motorsports in 2011, scoring a best finish of fifteenth at Nashville Superspeedway in July; he planned to return to the team for a limited schedule in 2012, as well as running the full 2012 ARCA Racing Series schedule for Andy Belmont Racing.

Motorsports career results

NASCAR
(key) (Bold – Pole position awarded by qualifying time. Italics – Pole position earned by points standings or practice time. * – Most laps led.)

Nationwide Series

Camping World Truck Series

ARCA Racing Series
(key) (Bold – Pole position awarded by qualifying time. Italics – Pole position earned by points standings or practice time. * – Most laps led.)

References

External links
 

Living people
1983 births
People from Westlake, Louisiana
Racing drivers from Louisiana
NASCAR drivers
ARCA Menards Series drivers
CARS Tour drivers